Eugeniu Cebotaru (born 16 October 1984) is a Moldovan professional football coach and a former player. He serves as an assistant coach for Liga I club Petrolul Ploiești.

Career statistics

International stats

International goals
Scores and results list Moldova's goal tally first.

Honours
Zimbru Chișinău
Moldovan Cup: 2003–04

Ceahlăul Piatra Neamț
Liga II: 2008–09, 2010–11

Petrolul Ploiești
Liga II: 2021–22

References

External links

1984 births
Living people
Footballers from Chișinău
Moldovan people of Romanian descent
Moldovan footballers
Moldova international footballers
Association football midfielders
Moldovan Super Liga players
FC Zimbru Chișinău players
Liga I players
CSM Ceahlăul Piatra Neamț players
LPS HD Clinceni players
Liga II players
FC Petrolul Ploiești players
Russian Premier League players
PFC Spartak Nalchik players
FC Sibir Novosibirsk players
Moldovan expatriate footballers
Moldovan expatriate sportspeople in Romania
Expatriate footballers in Romania
Moldovan expatriate sportspeople in Russia
Expatriate footballers in Russia